Depletion may refer to:

Environment
 Resource depletion, decline of resources
 Gas depletion, decline of oil supply
 Nutrient depletion, loss of nutrients in a habitat
 Oil depletion, decline of oil supply
 Overdrafting, extracting groundwater beyond the equilibrium yield of an aquifer
 Ozone depletion, a decline in the total amount of ozone in Earth's atmosphere

Physics
 Depletion force, an effective force in molecular and colloidal systems
 Depletion region, in semiconductor physics
 Grain boundary depletion, a mechanism of corrosion

Other uses
 Ego depletion, idea that self-control or willpower draws upon a limited pool of mental resources that can be used up
 Depletion (accounting), an accounting and tax concept used in mining, timber, petroleum, or other similar industries
 T-cell depletion, process of T cell removal or reduction